Achawa may refer to:
 Achawa people, an ethnic group of Colombia and Venezuela
 Achawa language, a language of Colombia
 An alternative spelling of ahava (in Hebrew)